Manfred Deckert (born 31 March 1961) is an East German former ski jumper.

Career
He won the overall victory at the Four Hills Tournament in the 1981–82 season. Deckert represented Klingenthal at the 1980 Winter Olympics in Lake Placid, New York winning a silver medal in the normal hill competition (tied with Hirokazu Yagi of Japan). He also won a bronze medal in the team large hill competition at the 1985 FIS Nordic World Ski Championships in Seefeld.

Deckert is currently the President for VSC Klingenthal / SC Dynamo Klingenthal.

World Cup

Standings

Wins

References

1961 births
Living people
Sportspeople from Halle (Saale)
People from Bezirk Halle
German male ski jumpers
Olympic ski jumpers of East Germany
Ski jumpers at the 1980 Winter Olympics
Olympic silver medalists for East Germany
Olympic medalists in ski jumping
FIS Nordic World Ski Championships medalists in ski jumping
Medalists at the 1980 Winter Olympics